Vishal Uppal (born 10 November 1976) is a tennis player from India. He participated in the Davis Cup in 2000 and 2002.

He actually started playing cricket at school as a young boy, but switched to tennis at the age of 11. He played in Father O'Brien's tennis tournament at school and lost in the semifinals, but it made him determined to keep playing and to win. In 2002 he represented India in the Davis Cup and he won the men's doubles bronze with Mustafa Ghouse. He played in the Davis Cup in both 2000 and 2002.

He graduated from the Shri Ram College of Commerce and coaches other students in tennis today including students at the Junior Davis Cup. He is also part of the junior AITA selection committee.

References
7. Vishaal Uppal: Turning your Passion into a Profession Career Ahead Magazine, October 2020

Living people
1976 births
Indian male tennis players
Place of birth missing (living people)
Asian Games medalists in tennis
Tennis players at the 2002 Asian Games
Asian Games bronze medalists for India
Medalists at the 2002 Asian Games